Dunbar Rovers FC is a semi-professional Australian association football club that plays in First Grade and Under 20s of the NSW League One Men's (formerly National Premier Leagues 2 New South Wales) competition, the NSW League 3 Boys Youth competitions (Under 13, 14, 15, 16, 18), as well as various Men's, Women's and Girls & Boys Junior teams in the Eastern Suburbs Football Association.

References

External links
 

Soccer clubs in Sydney